South Haven is a hamlet in Suffolk County, New York, United States, on the south shore of Long Island.

South Haven is part of the Town of Brookhaven, and is not to be confused with the hamlet of Brookhaven, with which it shares a ZIP Code.

History 
South Haven was the shortened form of the original name of the hamlet: South Brookhaven.

Geography
South Haven is dominated by two large parcels of parkland: South Haven County Park, and the Wertheim National Wildlife Refuge.

In popular culture
Element One made a progressive trance song called "South Haven" in 2009.

References

External links
The Sister Hamlets of Brookhaven and South Haven - Views and History
Carmans River

Brookhaven, New York
Hamlets in New York (state)
Hamlets in Suffolk County, New York